Leo IV the Khazar (Greek: Λέων ὁ Χάζαρος, Leōn IV ho Khazaros; 25 January 750 – 8 September 780) was Byzantine emperor from 775 to 780 AD. He was born to Emperor Constantine V and Empress Tzitzak in 750. He was elevated to co-emperor in the next year, in 751, and married to Irene of Athens in 768. When Constantine V died in September 775, while campaigning against the Bulgarians,  Leo IV became senior emperor. In 778 Leo raided Abbasid Syria, decisively defeating the Abbasid army outside of Germanicia. Leo died on 8 September 780, of tuberculosis. He was succeeded by his underage son Constantine VI, with Irene serving as regent.

History
Leo IV was born on 25 January 750AD, to Emperor Constantine V and his first wife, Empress Tzitzak. Because his mother was a Khazar, Leo was given the epithet 'the Khazar'. Leo was elevated to co-emperor in 751, while still an infant. He became emperor on 14 September 775, after Constantine V died while campaigning against the Bulgarian Empire.

Leo was by this point suffering from tuberculosis, which, combined with the infancy of his son, Constantine VI, gave two of Leo's half-brothers, the caesares Nikephoros and Christopher, hope of attaining the throne. These hopes were crushed when, in 776, Leo elevated Constantine to caesar, declaring him to be his successor. Shortly after this, Nikephoros and Christopher were discovered conspiring against Leo. Despite public opinion supporting the execution of the pair, Leo instead chose to pardon them, although he did exile several other plotters to Cherson.

Invasion of the Abbasid Caliphate
Leo launched an invasion against the Abbasids in 778, invading Syria with a force made up of the armies of the multiple themes, including: the Opsikion Theme, led by Gregory; the Anatolic Theme, led by Artabasdos; the Armeniac Theme, led by Karisterotzes; the Bucellarian Theme, led by Tatzates; and the Thracesian Theme, led by Lachanodrakon. Lachanodrakon besieged Germanicia for a time, before he was bribed to raise the siege, and then began to raid the surrounding countryside. The Abbasids attacked Lachanodrakon while he was raiding, but were decisively defeated by several Byzantine armies. The Byzantine generals who led troops during this battle were given a triumphal entry when they returned to Constantinople. A number of Jacobites (adherents of the Syriac Orthodox Church) were taken from Syria and forcibly resettled in Thrace. The next year, in 779, Leo successfully repelled an attack by the Abbasids against Asia Minor.

Death and succession 
Leo died of a violent fever, due to his tuberculosis, on 8 September 780. Constantine, still only nine years old, became the new emperor, with Irene as his regent.

References

Citations

Bibliography

8th-century Byzantine emperors
Isaurian dynasty
750 births
780 deaths
Byzantine people of the Arab–Byzantine wars
Khazar people
770s in the Byzantine Empire
Irene of Athens
8th-century deaths from tuberculosis
Tuberculosis deaths in the Byzantine Empire
Sons of Byzantine emperors